The 2005 Middle Tennessee Blue Raiders football team represented Middle Tennessee State University in the 2005 NCAA Division I FBS football season. Coming off a 5–6 season the year prior, the Blue Raiders finished with a 4–7 record and a 3–4 record in the Sun Belt Conference to tie for fourth in the conference standings. Following the season, fellow fourth-place FIU was sanctioned by the NCAA and forced to vacate their wins. Additionally, first-place Arkansas State was found guilty of NCAA violations and self-imposed punishments including the vacating of four of their six wins that season. Head coach Andy McCollum, as well as the offensive and defensive coordinators for the Blue Raiders, were fired following the conclusion of the 2005 season.

Schedule

References

Middle Tennessee
Middle Tennessee Blue Raiders football seasons
Middle Tennessee Blue Raiders football